Apoorva D. Patel is a professor at the Centre for High Energy Physics, Indian Institute of Science, Bangalore. He is notable for his work on quantum algorithms, and the application of information theory concepts to understand the structure of genetic languages. His major field of work has been the theory of quantum chromodynamics, where he has used lattice gauge theory techniques to investigate spectral properties, phase transitions, and matrix elements.

Education
He obtained his MSc in physics (1980) from the Indian Institute of Technology Bombay, and PhD in physics from the California Institute of Technology  under Geoffrey C. Fox (1984), with a thesis entitled: Monte Carlo Renormalisation Group for Lattice QCD. Prof. Richard Feynman was on his PhD thesis evaluation committee. The picture displayed above is from his graduation day at California Institute of Technology.

Career
He was a Scientific Associate, Theory Division, CERN in Geneva, Switzerland, 1987–1989,
and then in 1989 he joined the Indian Institute of Science, Bangalore, as a faculty member.

Personal life
In 1989, he married Rashmi, a surgeon specializing in laparoscopy and endosurgery. His son, Aavishkar, was born in 1990.

See also
 Quantum Aspects of Life

References

External links
 Patel's homepage
 Patel on DLPB
 Patel on Scientific Commons
 Patel's publications
 Patel on Math Genealogy
 Scientific publications of Apoorva D. Patel on INSPIRE-HEP

Living people
Scientists from Mumbai
California Institute of Technology alumni
20th-century Indian physicists
Indian quantum physicists
IIT Bombay alumni
Academic staff of the Indian Institute of Science
People associated with CERN
Year of birth missing (living people)